The Sarada Vidyalayam school was founded on 14 July 1992 by Dr. Chandra Sekhar Sankurathri with the objective of providing free education to children in rural Kakinada, India, where illiteracy and poverty are commonplace. The school is funded by charitable donations raised by Dr. Chandra and the Sankurathri Foundation and receives no financial assistance from the Indian government or the parents of its students.

Teaching
While the school follows the State syllabus, the teaching methodology used is different from the methods employed in conventional schools. With a student-teacher ratio of less than 1:10, teachers can monitor the progress of each child.  Besides providing an education, the school provides free bus transportation for kids who don't live within walking distance.

The school provides a lunch, which for many of the children is their only meal of the day.  The school provides medical and dental checkups (including medicines) and Hepatitis-B vaccinations.  Everything from books and schoolbags to uniforms and shoes is provided to students at no charge. The school gives two sets of uniforms to each child.

References
CBC News Documentary
CNN 'Heroes' article on founder
United States based charity for school
Canada based charity for school
School

Schools in East Godavari district
Education in Kakinada
Educational institutions established in 1992
1992 establishments in Andhra Pradesh